Hiroshi Enatsu (12 September 1922  – 4 August 2019) was a Japanese theoretical physicist who contributed to a relativistic Hamiltonian formalism in quantum field theory.

Academic works 
Enatsu has found that the commutation relation

in a relativistic Hamiltonian formalism  
is equivalent to that in the conventional non-relativistic Hamiltonian formalism of quantum field theory, 
where  is the commutator, 
 is space-time coordinates, 
 is proper time, 
with the aid of the relation

.

Here, 

Biography

Early stage
Enatsu was born on 12 September 1922 in Miyakonojō as a son of Eizo and Fumi (Kuroiwa) Enatsu.  
Miyakonojō is a town within the territory of the former Satsuma Domain, 
and it was rather natural for Enatsu to receive an education in Kagoshima. 
So, he spent in Kagoshima for secondary education and junior college.

Encounter with Hideki Yukawa
In the last year of junior college, 
Hideki Yukawa made a lecture on meson theory at Kagoshima. 
After listening to the lecture, 
Enatsu became interested in Yukawa and meson theory,
so he decided to study under Yukawa.  
He studied on meson theory under Yukawa in undergraduate course.  
He received Bachelor of Science from Kyoto Imperial University in 1944.  
He received Doctor of Science. from Kyoto Imperial University in 1953 under Yukawa.
Enatsu was an assistant under Yukawa at Kyoto University from 1946 to 1957.  
Enatsu was a research assistant at Columbia University  in New York City from 1952 to 1953.

Encounter with Niels Bohr
Enatsu was a visiting member of the Institute for Theoretical Physics in Copenhagen from 1955 to 1956.  
During his stay in Copenhagen, 
he could ask some questions to Bohr almost every week.
It was a special treatment.

Professor at Ritsumeikan University
In 1957, 
Enatsu was an assistant professor and inaugurated a professor at Ritsumeikan University in Kyoto.  
From 1971 to 1972, 
he was also the dean of faculty of science and engineering at Ritsumeikan University.  
In 1988, 
he retired from a professor at Ritsumeikan University in Kyoto, and has been a professor emeritus.  
In 1997. 
he received the 3rd class of the Order of the Sacred Treasure.  
Enatsu died on 4 August 2019 in Kyoto

Notes

Research articles 
 On the Photodisintegration of the Deuteron (Pseudoscalar Meson Theory.), December 1949
 On the Nuclear Forces, February 1950
 On the Interaction of Mesons and Nucleons, September 1950
 On the Mass of Cohesive Meson and the Mass Difference Of Nucleon, April 1951
 On the Mass of Cohesive Meson and the Mass Difference of Nucleons, II, June 1951
 On the Mass Difference of Nucleons and the Cohesive Mesons, October 1951
 On the Self-energies of Mesons, October 1951
 On the Self-Energies of Nucleons, October 1951
 Self-Energies of Nucleons and the Mass Spectra of Heavy Particles, February 1952
 Mass Spectrum of Elementary Particles I: Eigenvalue Problem in Space-time, February 1954
 Mass Spectrum of Elementary Particles, II, September 1954
 Theory of Unstable Heavy Particles, July 1954
 Relativistic quantum mechanics and mass-quantization, 1956
 Relativistic Hamiltonian Formalism in Quantum Field Theory and Micro-Noncausality, August 1963
  Covariant Hamiltonian Formalism for Particles of any Spin and Nonzero Mass, 1968
 Micro-noncausal theory of the hydrogen atom 1971
 Covariant Hamiltonian formalism for quantized fields and the hydrogen mass levels, 1975
 On the hyperfine structure splittings of hydrogen, 1975
 Proton-proton scattering problem in a covariant Hamiltonian formalism, 1976
 Four-dimensional tensor forces and electric quadrupole moments in the bound-states of the deuteron, 1976
 Micrononcausal euclidean wave functions for hadrons, February 1978
 Hyperfine structure splittings of the hydrogen atom in a covariant Hamiltonian formalism, 1983
 Bethe-Salpeter type equations for a covariant Hamiltonian formalism in quantum field theory, 1984
 Quantization of masses of elementary particles with micrononcausal structures, October 1986
 Quantization of masses of elementary particles with micrononcausal structures 1987
  Quantization of the mass of the W-boson in the Weinberg-Salam theory, 1988

References 

 Levere Hostler,  "Quantum field theory of particles of indefinite mass. II. An electromagnetic model", 1981
 John R. Fanchi & Weldon J. Wilson,  "Relativistic many-body systems: Evolution-parameter formalism", 1983
 Matej Pavsic,  "PseudoEuclidean signature harmonic oscillator, quantum field theory and vanishing cosmological constant", 1998
 Juan P. Aparcio, Fabian H. Gaioli, and Edgardo T. Garcia Alvarez, "Proper Time Derivatives in Quantum Mechanics", 1998
 Edgardo T. Garcia Alvarez & Fabian H. Gaioli, "Covariant Hamiltonian Formalisms for Particles and Antiparticles", 1999
 (Eds.) Rosolino Buccheri, Metod Saniga & William Mark Stuckey, "The Nature of Time: Geometry, Physics and Perception", pp. 173-pp. 174, 2003 (Springer).
 Ed Seidewitz, "Foundations of a Spacetime Path Formalism for Relativistic Quantum Mechanics", November 2006

Japanese physicists
Academic staff of Ritsumeikan University
Academic staff of Kyoto University
Japanese expatriates in the United States
Kyoto University alumni
Kagoshima University alumni
People from Miyazaki Prefecture
1922 births
2019 deaths